Yvonne Meley (30 May 1888 – 1 July 1982) was a French painter. Her work was part of the painting event in the art competition at the 1924 Summer Olympics.

References

1888 births
1982 deaths
19th-century French painters
19th-century French women artists
20th-century French painters
20th-century French women artists
French women painters
Olympic competitors in art competitions
Painters from Paris